Ermin Street or Ermin Way was a Roman road in Britain. It linked Glevum (Gloucester) and Corinium (Cirencester) to Calleva (Silchester).

At Glevum, it connected to the road to Isca (Caerleon), the legionary base in southeast Wales. At Corinium, it connected to the Fosse Way between Isca (Exeter) and Lindum (Lincoln). At Calleva, it connected to the Devil's Highway to Londinium (London) and the Kentish ports, as well as to other routes to points in the southwest.

The road has been assigned the Margary number 41. Much of its route of the road is now covered by the modern A417, A419 and B4000 roads.

See also
 Roman roads in Britain

References 

Archaeological sites in Berkshire
Archaeological sites in Gloucestershire
Archaeological sites in Hampshire
Archaeological sites in Wiltshire
Roman roads in England